List of people who worked at Sun Microsystems at some point prior to its acquisition by Oracle Corporation.

A 
 Brian Aker, MySQL Director of Technology
 Ken Arnold, Sun Microsystems Laboratories, co-author of "The Java Programming Language".

B 
 Carol Bartz, head of SunFed, Sun service and worldwide operations; Autodesk CEO, Yahoo! CEO
 Andy Bechtolsheim, Sun co-founder, systems designer and Silicon Valley investor
 Joshua Bloch, author of Effective Java
 Jon Bosak, chair of the original XML working group
 Jeff Bonwick, slab-allocator, vmem and ZFS
 Steve Bourne, creator of the Bourne shell
 Tim Bray, Director of Web Technologies
 David J. Brown, SUN workstation and Solaris
 Paul Buchheit, engineer at Sun from May 1997 to August 1997; Creator of Gmail

C 
 Bryan Cantrill, of 2005 Technology Review "Top 35 Young Innovators", co-inventor of DTrace. 
 Alfred Chuang, co-founder of BEA Systems
 Danny Cohen, co-creator of Cohen-Sutherland line clipping algorithms, coined the computer terms "Big Endians" and "Little Endians" (Endianness)
 Danese Cooper, Open Source specialist

D 
 James Duncan Davidson, creator of the Tomcat web container and the Ant build tool
 L. Peter Deutsch, founder of Aladdin Enterprises and creator of Ghostscript
 Whitfield Diffie, Chief Security Officer, co-inventor of public-key cryptography
 Robert Drost, one of Technology Review'''s 2004 "Top 100 Young Innovators"

 F 
 Dan Farmer, computer security researcher
 Marc Fleury, creator of the JBoss application server
 Ned Freed, email systems researcher, co-author of several MIME RFCs

 G 
 Richard P. Gabriel, Lisp expert and founder of Lucid, Inc.
 John Gage, Chief Researcher and former Science Officer; first Sun salesman
 John Gilmore, co-founder of the Electronic Frontier Foundation and Cygnus Solutions
 Gary Ginstling, music industry executive
 James Gosling, co-inventor of Java; creator of NeWS networked extensible window system; author of the first (proprietary) Unix implementation of the Emacs text editor
 Todd Greanier, software architect, author and instructor
 Brendan Gregg, author of DTrace: Dynamic Tracing in Oracle Solaris, Mac OS X and FreeBSD, Systems Performance: Enterprise and the Cloud''

J 
 Kim Jones, Vice President of Global Education, Government and Health Sciences; CEO of Sun UK from 2007; CEO of Curriki
 Bill Joy, Sun co-founder and architect of BSD Unix; author of the vi text editor

K 
 Vinod Khosla, Sun co-founder and Silicon Valley investor

L 
 Susan Landau, mathematician and cybersecurity expert
 Adam Leventhal, co-inventor of DTrace
 Peter van der Linden, former manager of kernel group, author of numerous Java and C books

M 

 Chris Malachowsky, co-founder of NVIDIA
 Clark Masters EVP, Enterprise Systems and Father of the E10K, President of SunFed
 Craig McClanahan, creator or the Apache Struts framework and architect of Tomcat's servlet container, Catalina
 Scott McNealy, co-founder and Chairman of the Board of Sun; CEO from 1984-2006
 Larry McVoy, CEO of BitMover
 Björn Michaelsen, Director at The Document Foundation
 Mårten Mickos, CEO of MySQL AB from 2001 until Sun acquisition in 2008
 Jim Mitchell, Vice President and Sun Fellow
 Ian Murdock, Vice President of Developer and Community Marketing, founder of Debian

N 
 Satya Nadella, CEO of Microsoft
 Patrick Naughton, co-creator of Java
 Jakob Nielsen, web-design usability authority
 Peter Norvig, Director of Research Google

O 
 John Ousterhout, inventor of the Tcl scripting language

P 
 Greg Papadopoulos, Executive Vice President and CTO
 Radia Perlman, sometimes known as the "Mother of the Internet"
 Simon Phipps, Chief Open Source Officer
 Kim Polese, prominent dot-com era executive
 Curtis Priem, co-founder of NVIDIA

R 
 George Reyes, former CFO of Google, Inc.
 David S. H. Rosenthal, early X Window System developer and original designer of the ICCCM
 Wayne Rosing, project lead for the Apple Lisa; Sun hardware development manager and manager of Sun Labs

S 
 Bob Scheifler, leader of X Window System development from 1984 to 1996
 Eric Schmidt, former Sun Chief Technology Officer, chairman and former CEO of Google, Inc., and co-developer of lex
 Jonathan I. Schwartz, former President and CEO of Sun
 Mike Shapiro, co-inventor of DTrace
 Bob Sproull, computer graphics pioneer
 Guy L. Steele, Jr., co-inventor of the Scheme programming language and member of IEEE standards committees of many programming languages
 Bert Sutherland, manager of Sun Labs, Xerox PARC, BBN Computer Science Division
 Ivan Sutherland, computer graphics pioneer

T 
 Bruce Tognazzini, computer usability consultant
 Marc Tremblay, microprocessor architect and Sun's employee with the most awarded patents
 Bud Tribble, former VP of software development at NeXT, current VP of software technology at Apple

W 
 Jim Waldo, lead architect of Jini
 Michael Widenius, original author of MySQL

Y 
 William Yeager, software architect, inventor of the multi-protocol router.

Z 
 Edward Zander, former President of Sun Microsystems; former CEO of Motorola

References

Lists of people by company
Computing-related lists
Employees
San Francisco Bay Area-related lists
Employees by company